Basum may be,

Basum Lake, Tibet
Basum language, Tibet